Viforâta may refer to several places in Romania:

 Viforâta, a village in Berca Commune, Buzău County
 Viforâta, a village in Aninoasa Commune, Dâmboviţa County

See also
 Viforâta River (disambiguation)